James Archer Rigg (c. 1872 – 29 May 1951), also known by the nickname of "Archie ", was an English rugby union, and professional rugby league footballer who played in the 1890s and 1900s, and coached rugby union in the 1910s and 1920s. Prior to Tuesday 27 August 1895, Halifax was a rugby union club.

Background
Archie Rigg's birth was registered in Halifax district, West Riding of Yorkshire. He died at his home in Halifax on 29 May 1951, aged 79.

Playing career

County Honours
Archie Rigg won caps for Yorkshire (RL) while at Halifax.

Challenge Cup Final appearances
Archie Rigg played, and was captain in Halifax's 7-0 victory over by Salford in the 1903 Challenge Cup final, during the 1902–03 season at Headingley Rugby Stadium, Leeds, in front of a crowd of 32,507.

Testimonial match
Archie Rigg's Testimonial match at Halifax took place against Huddersfield at Thrum Hall, Halifax on Saturday 23 January 1904, Halifax's first ever matchday programme was produced for the match.

Club career records
Archie Rigg made his début on Saturday 19 September 1891 under rugby union rules, he was rugby league's 1896–97 Northern Rugby Football Union season top point scorer, with 112-points, and he played for Halifax until 1906 before moving to Bradford.

Honoured at Halifax
Archie Rigg is a Halifax Hall Of Fame Inductee.

References

External links
Search for "Archie Rigg" at britishnewspaperarchive.co.uk
Search for "Archer Rigg" at britishnewspaperarchive.co.uk
Search for "James Archer Rigg" at britishnewspaperarchive.co.uk
Search for "James Rigg" at britishnewspaperarchive.co.uk

1870s births
1951 deaths
Bradford Bulls players
English rugby league players
English rugby union coaches
English rugby union players
Great Britain national rugby league team players
Halifax R.L.F.C. captains
Halifax R.L.F.C. players
Halifax RUFC coaches
People from Sowerby Bridge
Rugby league halfbacks
Rugby league players from Halifax, West Yorkshire
Rugby union players from Halifax, West Yorkshire
Yorkshire rugby league team players